J Paul Robinson (born June 7, 1946, San Diego, California), known as J Robinson, is an American former wrestler who competed in the 1972 Summer Olympics, where he competed as a middleweight Greco-Roman wrestler.

Wrestling in the 82 kilogram weight class, Robinson finished 4th in the 1970 World Wrestling Championships, held in Edmonton, Alberta, Canada. He finished 5th in the same event at the 1971 World Wrestling Championships in Sofia, Bulgaria. In 2005, Robinson was inducted into the National Wrestling Hall of Fame as a Distinguished Member.

Robinson was the wrestling coach at the University of Minnesota for 30 years until his termination on 7 September 2016, following an investigation into a prescription drug scandal (Xanax) involving the Golden Gophers wrestling program. During his tenure from 1986 to 2016, Minnesota won three national titles (2001, 2002, and 2007), six Big Ten titles (1999, 2001, 2002, 2003, 2006, 2007), and had 14 individual national champions.

Robinson served as a United States Army Ranger and is a Vietnam Veteran.

References

Olympic wrestlers of the United States
Wrestlers at the 1972 Summer Olympics
American male sport wrestlers
People from San Diego
1946 births
Living people
Minnesota Golden Gophers wrestling coaches